Perry Creek may refer to:

 Perry Creek (British Columbia), a stream in Canada
 Perry Creek (Conasauga River tributary), a stream in Georgia
 Perry Creek (Missouri River), a stream in Iowa

See also
 Perry Run, a stream in Ohio